Valentina Giovagnini (6 April 1980 – 2 January 2009) was an Italian pop singer, active between 2001 and 2009. She was born in Arezzo, Italy.

She made her first appearance at the Sanremo Music Festival (Youth Section) in 2002, coming second with the song "Il passo silenzioso della neve" (The Quiet Step of the Snow).

Her first solo album, "Creatura nuda" (Nude Creature), uses unusual typical Celtic instruments: whistle, musette de cour, uilleann pipes and others. It was released in March 2002.

She died at the age of 28 in Siena, Italy due to a car accident.

A second posthumous record entitled "L'amore non ha fine" (Love Has No End), containing songs recorded from 2003 to 2008, and never before released, including the title-track of this record L'amore non ha fine, was released in May 2009.

Discography

Albums

Singles

 "Dovevo dire di no (il traffico dei sensi)" (2001)
 "Il passo silenzioso della neve / Dovevo dire di no (il traffico dei sensi) / Accarezzando a piedi nudi le colline di Donegal / Il passo silenzioso della neve (base)" (2002)
 "Senza origine" (Promo Radio, 2002)
 "Creatura nuda" (Promo Radio 2002)
 "Non piango più / Voglio quello che sento / Non piango più (instrumental)" (2003)
 "L'amore non ha fine" (Promo Radio, 2009)

Further reading

External links 
Valentina Giovagnini Official Website 
Valentina Giovagnini Music Award Website 

People from Arezzo
1980 births
2009 deaths
Road incident deaths in Italy
20th-century Italian women singers